Vysočany is a village in the commune of Hrušovany, Chomutov District in the Ústí nad Labem Region of the Czech Republic.

References 
 Czech Statistical Office: Communes of Chomutov District

Villages in Chomutov District
Villages in the Ore Mountains